Cheng Qiuming (born March 1960) is a Chinese mathematical geoscientist. He is a professor and founding director of the State Key Lab of Geological Processes and Mineral Resources, China University of Geosciences (Beijing). He received the William Christian Krumbein Medal in 2008 from the International Association for Mathematical Geosciences. He was the President of the International Association for Mathematical Geosciences (2012–2016). He is currently the President of the International Union of Geological Sciences (IUGS).

References

1960 births
People from Jinzhong
Living people
Chinese geologists
Academic staff of York University
University of Ottawa alumni
Academic staff of China University of Geosciences
Members of the Chinese Academy of Sciences
Scientists from Shanxi
Chinese expatriates in Canada